Bor is a rural locality (a village) in Gorodishchenskoye Rural Settlement, Nyuksensky District, Vologda Oblast, Russia. The population was 107 as of 2002.

Geography 
Bor is located 39 km southeast of Nyuksenitsa (the district's administrative centre) by road. Zhar is the nearest rural locality.

References 

Rural localities in Nyuksensky District